Conning may refer to:

 Conning (company), a global investment management firm serving the insurance industry
 Conning tower, a raised platform on a ship or submarine from which an officer can give directions to the helmsman
 Rico Conning (1077–2018), producer, songwriter, sound designer, and guitarist

See also
 Conn (disambiguation)
 Con (disambiguation)
 Cons (disambiguation)
 Cheating